The San Rafael Bridge (also known as the San Rafael Swinging Bridge or the Buckhorn Wash Bridge) is a historic suspension bridge over the San Rafael River in central Emery County, Utah, United States, that is listed on the National Register of Historic Places (NRHP).

Description
The bridge was built by the Civilian Conservation Corps in between 1935-37. Until the 1990s, it was the only bridge crossing the river. It no longer carries automobile traffic, but it is still open for pedestrian use. It was added to the NRHP June 3, 1996.

See also

List of bridges on the National Register of Historic Places in Utah
List of bridges documented by the Historic American Engineering Record in Utah
National Register of Historic Places listings in Emery County, Utah

References

External links

Buildings and structures in Emery County, Utah
Pedestrian bridges in the United States
Suspension bridges in the United States
Road bridges on the National Register of Historic Places in Utah
Civilian Conservation Corps in Utah
Historic American Engineering Record in Utah
National Register of Historic Places in Emery County, Utah
1937 establishments in Utah